Crypsotidia mesosema is a moth of the family Erebidae first described by George Hampson in 1913. It is found in Burkina Faso, Cape Verde, Egypt, Ghana, Kenya, Niger, Nigeria, Senegal and Sudan.

The larvae feed on Acacia albida.

References

Moths described in 1913
Crypsotidia